James Vincent Hayes (24 March 1879 – 1 June 1964), also known as Vic Hayes, was an English footballer who primarily played as a full-back. Born in Miles Platting, Manchester, he was trained in boilermaking in his early years. He made his debut for Newton Heath in February 1901. At Newton Heath, which was renamed Manchester United in 1902, he suffered several injuries. He broke both legs in 1905, and shortly after recovering, broke one again. He left United for Brentford in May 1907, but returned to United in June 1908. He helped the club win the FA Cup in 1909. He left United in November 1910 after scoring two goals in 128 appearances in his two spells at the club.

He later coached Norway at the 1912 Summer Olympics and Wiener SC. In 1923, he was appointed to his last managerial role, with Atlético Madrid of Spain.

Honours
Manchester United
FA Cup: 1908–09

References

1879 births
Year of death missing
People from Miles Platting
English footballers
Association football defenders
Manchester United F.C. players
Brentford F.C. players
Bradford (Park Avenue) A.F.C. players
Rochdale A.F.C. players
English football managers
English expatriate football managers
Norway national football team managers
English expatriate sportspeople in Norway
Expatriate football managers in Norway
Rochdale A.F.C. managers
Preston North End F.C. managers
Atlético Madrid managers
First Vienna FC managers
Wiener Sport-Club managers
English Football League players
English Football League representative players
FA Cup Final players